Idiomarina atlantica is a Gram-negative, aerobic, slightly curved rod-shaped and non-motile bacterium from the genus of Idiomarina which has been isolated from sediments from Atlantic Ocean.

References

Bacteria described in 2015
Alteromonadales